Neum is a town and municipality in Bosnia and Herzegovina, located in Herzegovina-Neretva Canton of the Federation of Bosnia and Herzegovina. It is the only town to be situated along the Bosnia and Herzegovina's coastline, making it the country's only access to the Adriatic Sea. As of 2013, Neum municipality has a population of 4,653 inhabitants, while the town of Neum has a population of 3,013 inhabitants.

Geography 

The Bosnia and Herzegovina coastal strip of Neum cuts off the southernmost Croatian exclave from the rest of Croatia. This is a result of the Treaty of Karlowitz of 1699. Since 1991 and the breakup of Yugoslavia, the borders between Croatia and Bosnia and Herzegovina in the Neum region have been international borders.

Subdivision
The municipality includes the town of Neum (municipal seat) and several villages:

Babin Do, Borut, Brestica, Broćanac, Brštanica, Cerovica, Cerovo, Crnoglav, Dobri Do, Dobrovo, Donji Drijen, Donji Zelenikovac, Dubravica, Duži, Glumina, Gornje Hrasno, Gradac, Hotanj Hutovski, Hutovo, Kiševo, Moševići, Prapratnica, Previš, Rabrani, Vinine and Žukovica.

Border crossings
Neum has two border crossing checkpoints with Croatia on the European route E65 or Adriatic Highway which connects the two parts of Croatia's Dalmatian coast. Neum 1 is located to the northwest of the city, with the Klek border checkpoint on the Croatian side. Neum 2 is located to the southeast, with the Croatian border checkpoint at Zaton Doli.

History
The Neum corridor dates back to the Treaty of Karlowitz of 1699, whereby the Republic of Ragusa was separated from the Dalmatian possessions of its rival Venice by two buffer zones ceded by Ragusa to the Ottoman Empire to prevent the possibility of Venice invading via land: north of its territory is Neum and the bay of Klek, and south of its territory is Sutorina with the port of Herceg Novi on the Bay of Kotor, now part of Montenegro since 1947 (later the topic of the now-resolved Sutorina dispute).

The Karlowitz borders were reaffirmed in 1718 by the Treaty of Passarowitz, but then the Ottomans, tired of negotiating in vain with Venice for a widening of their maritime access, simply usurped the territory of Gornji Klek and most of Klek from Ragusa, which it had bought from King Dabiša of Bosnia at the end of the 14th century. After the fall of the Republic of Venice in 1797, and the Congress of Vienna in 1815, the Austrian Empire, which had annexed both the Dalmatian possessions of Venice and the territory of Ragusa, tried to buy back the Neum and Sutorina enclaves from the Ottomans, but in vain. Instead, it stationed a warship to block access to the port of Neum until the Treaty of Berlin, which gave the whole of Bosnia and Herzegovina to Austria-Hungary in 1878. Neum had been under Ottoman control for 179 years.

Consideration was given to a plan to build a new advanced naval base at Neum-Klek by the Austro-Hungarian Navy. General Franz Conrad von Hötzendorf considered fortifying Neum with coastal batteries and torpedo craft to supplement seafront defenses (in order to prevent Italian raids, or worse a large scale Italian landing). The project never got past the planning stage prior to the outbreak of World War I in 1914. 

In 1918, as a consequence of Austro-Hungarian defeat, Neum joined the Kingdom of Serbs, Croats and Slovenes which would become the Kingdom of Yugoslavia in 1929. Under the Karađorđević dynasty, the Yugoslav Government ignored the borders inherited from history twice: in 1929, when the Neum area was included in the Littoral Banovina, and in 1939 when, following the Cvetković–Maček Agreement, it was included in the Banovina of Croatia. Josip Broz Tito's federal Yugoslavia was founded on the principle, declared at the 1943 AVNOJ session in Jajce and comparatively well-respected by the Đilas commission in 1945, of establishing the federative republics in their borders of 1878, which is why the Neum enclave is now part of independent Bosnia and Herzegovina, including most of Klek (Ponta Kleka, Rep Kleka), the two islets Veliki and Mali Školj and the rock of Lopata in the Bay of Klek.

Since the 1990s, Croatia and Bosnia and Herzegovina have been in negotiations on how to handle traffic across the Neum region, including signing a Neum Agreement. When Croatia was admitted to the European Union in 2013, the border crossings in the Neum region became governed as external borders of the EU. The construction of the Pelješac Bridge, which bypasses Neum entirely, has significance for Croatia's integrity and also for its future Schengen Area membership and the EU as a whole.

Encouraged by the recent developments in Croatia–Slovenia border disputes (June 2017), the ruling Bosniak Party of Democratic Action (SDA) and other Bosniak political parties decided to obstruct  the construction.

The construction cost was €420 million, to which the EU contributed by allocating €357 million from Cohesion Policy funds. The bridge is among the largest infrastructures in Croatia currently and one of the most substantial EU infrastructural investment ever. The work was completed in mid 2022. The EU is also funding supporting infrastructure, such as the construction of access roads, including tunnels, bridges and viaducts, the building of an 8 km-long bypass near the town of Ston and upgrading works on the existing road D414.

There are Bosniak plans to convert Neum to a freight port, contrary to the wishes of the local population and international laws and agreements concerning the ecologically significant and protected Bay of Mali Ston, of which Bay of Neum is a part. There are plans to build a seaport, rail and a motorway and thus the Croatian bridge must have a high clearance according to the view of Bosnia and Herzegovina's Bosniak political parties. Due to the above, the Republic of Croatia has significantly increased the height of the bridge by adapting it to ships whose dimensions cannot enter the Bay of Neum at all. Today the main freight port for Bosnia and Herzegovina is Ploče (in Croatia) further north, which has a railway to Bosnia and Herzegovina.

Climate

The climate of the area is Mediterranean, characterized by mild winters and dry summers, with three times more rain in the rainier than in the drier months, during which the mean precipitation does not exceed . The dominant winds come from the north, north-east and north-west.

Vegetation is the evergreen Mediterranean type, and subtropical flora (palm trees, agaves, cacti) grow in Neum and its surroundings.

Demographics
All demographic data per Statistica.ba website:

Population

Ethnic composition

Culture and sport 
The linđo is traditionally danced in the Neum region. Neum celebrates the feast of Our Lady of Good Health as its municipal day. As part of the celebrations, Neum hosts the Music Festival Etnofest Neum. The town also hosts the Neum Animated Film Festival.

Neum is home to local branches of the cultural organizations Matica hrvatska and HKD Napredak.
Popular activities include swimming and sun bathing, beach-going, boating, and various other water-sports. Neum has a water polo club VK Jadran Neum, which is a member of the Croatian Water Polo Federation.

Tourism
Neum area has steep hills, stone-sandy beaches, and several large tourist hotels. Neum has about 5,000 beds for tourists, 1,810 in hotels with the remaining capacity in motels, villas, and private accommodation. Tourism in Neum is active only in the coastal region. Prices tend to be lower than in neighbouring Croatia, making it popular with shoppers. Tourism, and the commerce it brings, is the leading contributor to the economy of the area.

The inland area behind Neum has a rich archeological history and wilderness with centuries-old olive groves.

See also
 Bosnia and Herzegovina–Croatia relations
 List of lighthouses in Bosnia and Herzegovina
 Pelješac Bridge

References

External links

  (in Croatian and English)
 Neum Animated Film Festival
 
 

 
Populated places in Neum
Populated coastal places in Bosnia and Herzegovina
Port cities and towns of the Adriatic Sea
Bosnia and Herzegovina–Croatia border crossings
Lighthouses in Bosnia and Herzegovina